Strictly Speaking is an Australian television series which began airing on 29 September 2010. The show is hosted by Andrew Hansen and is currently being aired on ABC1. After only 5 episodes, Strictly Speaking was removed from ABC's schedule after failing to attract viewers. On 5 June 2011, the show returned to ABC1 in a new Sunday timeslot.

Format
The format of Strictly Speaking is based around that of a talent show where contestants compete for the title of Australia's best speaker. Each episode, three contestants perform a prepared speech and an impromptu speech in two individual rounds. The first round consists of each contestant performing a prepared speech. At the end of the round the judges decide on a score for each contestant. In the second round, contestants are given a topic to briefly prepare an impromptu speech from. At the end of the second round the judges again gives scores to each contestant, in effect announcing the winner for that episode.

Judging Criteria
Speeches are judged on the criteria of content, delivery, entertainment and other considerations. In the area of content, contestants are assessed on the subject matter; originality; creativity; quality of writing; structure; clarity and effectiveness of argument; and appropriateness of the speech. In the area of delivery, contestants are assessed on whether the speech was natural or practised; pitch, pace and volume; appearance; fluency; and emotion. In the area of entertainment, speeches are assessed on whether the performance connected with the audience; charisma; and personality. The final judging criteria are that of other considerations where performances are assessed on whether the speaker was speaking to everyone; whether the speaker could have varied pace more; whether the gestures matched the speech; and whether the speech was reasonably within the time limit.

Additional criteria are brought in for the second round to assess the impromptu speech. Judges consider whether the speech addressed the topic; how the topic was used in the speech; originality; whether it featured a logical structure; and whether the argument was concise.

Production
In July 2009, a contestant call went out for anyone who could be considered as a talented or confident public speaker. One month later, auditions for the show began. The auditions narrowed down over 1,500 applications into just 27 spots in the show's first series. On 31 August 2009, it was announced that Andrew Hansen would be the host for the show. On 8 December 2009, the Australian Broadcasting Corporation announced its programming lineup for 2010 which included Strictly Speaking. On 13 September 2010, it was announced that Strictly Speaking would fill the slot that The New Inventors vacated after its grand final on 22 September 2010. The first series began showing on 29 September 2010.

Episodes

Series 1

Reception
The ratings for the first episode weren't positive. The Spy Report stated "Strictly Speaking struggled to make an impression, averaging 586,000 viewers". The second episode received fewer viewers but ranked slightly better for the Wednesday ratings.

Ratings

External links

References

Australian Broadcasting Corporation original programming
2010 Australian television series debuts
2010 Australian television series endings
2010s Australian reality television series
Television series by Endemol Australia
English-language television shows